Beachwood is a borough in Ocean County, New Jersey, United States. As of the 2010 United States Census, the borough's population was 10,859, a decrease of 186 (-1.7%) from the 2010 census count 11,045, which in turn reflected an increase of 670 (+6.5%) from the 10,375 counted in the 2000 census.

Beachwood was incorporated as a Borough by an act of the New Jersey Legislature on March 22, 1917, from portions of Berkeley Township, based on the results of a referendum held on April 12, 1917.

History
The first residents of the community moved in during April 1915, and work on a Club House, the Pier, the Bath House, the Lodge, a dining hall and a railroad station were planned to be completed by the end of May. Other offerings within the development included tennis courts, and facilities along the beach and on the river for canoeing, sailing and swimming. The first "cottages" in the community were constructed during that first summer season.

A Property-Owner's Association was established in 1916. In addition to overseeing local services within the development, the organization also advocated that the community should become an independent municipality. Legislation was passed by the Legislature on March 22, 1917, and a referendum approving the establishment of the borough passed on April 12. On May 11, the borough's first council was elected, along with Joseph H. Senior, who was chosen by the voters as Beachwood's first mayor. A Board of Education was formed the following year, with school transportation provided on the back of a truck outfitted with wooden benches.

In December 2008, the Beachwood Historical Alliance was established, with the goal of the creation of an official town-run Preservation Commission for the purpose of recognizing, restoring and preserving aspects of Beachwood's formation, history and heritage.

Geography
According to the United States Census Bureau, the borough had a total area of 2.76 square miles (7.16 km2), including 2.76 square miles (7.16 km2) of land and <0.01 square miles (<0.01 km2) of water (0.04%).

The borough borders the Ocean County municipalities of Berkeley Township, Pine Beach and South Toms River.

The borough is one of 11 municipalities in Ocean County that are part of the Toms River watershed.

Demographics

2010 census

The Census Bureau's 2006–2010 American Community Survey showed that (in 2010 inflation-adjusted dollars) median household income was $78,611 (with a margin of error of +/− $5,668) and the median family income was $83,083 (+/− $4,210). Males had a median income of $58,981 (+/− $3,686) versus $46,632 (+/− $5,031) for females. The per capita income for the borough was $28,366 (+/− $1,915). About 5.2% of families and 6.7% of the population were below the poverty line, including 11.9% of those under age 18 and 3.9% of those age 65 or over.

2000 census
As of the 2000 United States census there were 10,375 people, 3,475 households, and 2,818 families residing in the borough. The racial makeup of the borough was 95.66% White, 0.97% African American, 0.13% Native American, 1.13% Asian, 0.06% Pacific Islander, 1.11% from other races, and 0.94% from two or more races. Hispanic or Latino of any race were 4.22% of the population.

There were 3,475 households, out of which 42.0% had children under the age of 18 living with them, 65.0% were married couples living together, 11.4% had a female householder with no husband present, and 18.9% were non-families. 15.0% of all households were made up of individuals, and 5.7% had someone living alone who was 65 years of age or older. The average household size was 2.98 and the average family size was 3.31.

In the borough the population was spread out, with 28.5% under the age of 18, 7.4% from 18 to 24, 32.8% from 25 to 44, 22.6% from 45 to 64, and 8.6% who were 65 years of age or older. The median age was 35 years. For every 100 females, there were 97.1 males. For every 100 females age 18 and over, there were 96.1 males.

The median income for a household in the borough was $59,022, and the median income for a family was $64,190. Males had a median income of $41,204 versus $30,189 for females. The per capita income for the borough was $21,247. About 2.9% of families and 4.5% of the population were below the poverty line, including 6.6% of those under age 18 and 2.7% of those age 65 or over.

Government

Local government
Beachwood was originally governed under the Walsh Act commission form of government, which was maintained until the mid-1970s. Beachwood is now governed under the Borough form of New Jersey municipal government, which is used in 218 municipalities (of the 564) statewide, making it the most common form of government in New Jersey. The governing body is comprised of the Mayor and the Borough Council, with all positions elected at-large on a partisan basis as part of the November general election. The Mayor is elected directly by the voters to a four-year term of office. The Borough Council is comprised of six members elected to serve three-year terms on a staggered basis, with two seats coming up for election each year in a three-year cycle. The Borough form of government used by Beachwood is a "weak mayor / strong council" government in which council members act as the legislative body with the mayor presiding at meetings and voting only in the event of a tie. The mayor can veto ordinances subject to an override by a two-thirds majority vote of the council. The mayor makes committee and liaison assignments for council members, and most appointments are made by the mayor with the advice and consent of the council.

, the Mayor of Beachwood is Republican Ronald F. Roma Jr., whose term of office ends December 31, 2023. Members of the Beachwood Borough Council are Council President Gerald "Jerry" LaCrosse (R, 2022), William J. Cairns (R, 2024), Beverly Clayton (R, 2024), Gregory Feeney (R, 2023), Steven Komsa (R, 2023) and Edward Zakar (R, 2022).

Bill Cairns was appointed to fill the vacant seat expiring in December 2015 of Thomas Miserendino, who died in office in June 2015.

Federal, state, and county representation
Beachwood is located in the 4th Congressional District and is part of New Jersey's 9th state legislative district.

 

Ocean County is governed by a Board of County Commissioners comprised of five members who are elected on an at-large basis in partisan elections and serving staggered three-year terms of office, with either one or two seats coming up for election each year as part of the November general election. At an annual reorganization held in the beginning of January, the board chooses a Director and a Deputy Director from among its members. , Ocean County's Commissioners (with party affiliation, term-end year and residence) are:

Commissioner Director John P. Kelly (R, 2022, Eagleswood Township),
Commissioner Deputy Director Virginia E. Haines (R, 2022, Toms River),
Barbara Jo Crea (R, 2024, Little Egg Harbor Township)
Gary Quinn (R, 2024, Lacey Township) and
Joseph H. Vicari (R, 2023, Toms River). Constitutional officers elected on a countywide basis are 
County Clerk Scott M. Colabella (R, 2025, Barnegat Light),
Sheriff Michael G. Mastronardy (R, 2022; Toms River) and
Surrogate Jeffrey Moran (R, 2023, Beachwood).

Politics
As of March 23, 2011, there were a total of 6,714 registered voters in Beachwood, of which 1,329 (19.8%) were registered as Democrats, 1,661 (24.7%) were registered as Republicans and 3,718 (55.4%) were registered as Unaffiliated. There were 6 voters registered as Libertarians or Greens. Among the borough's 2010 Census population, 60.8% (vs. 63.2% in Ocean County) were registered to vote, including 81.5% of those ages 18 and over (vs. 82.6% countywide).

In the 2012 presidential election, Republican Mitt Romney received 51.9% of the vote (2,264 cast), ahead of Democrat Barack Obama with 47.0% (2,048 votes), and other candidates with 1.1% (48 votes), among the 4,397 ballots cast by the borough's 6,979 registered voters (37 ballots were spoiled), for a turnout of 63.0%. In the 2008 presidential election, Republican John McCain received 51.5% of the vote (2,610 cast), ahead of Democrat Barack Obama with 46.2% (2,342 votes) and other candidates with 1.3% (68 votes), among the 5,064 ballots cast by the borough's 7,008 registered voters, for a turnout of 72.3%. In the 2004 presidential election, Republican George W. Bush received 58.9% of the vote (2,755 ballots cast), outpolling Democrat John Kerry with 40.0% (1,869 votes) and other candidates with 0.6% (38 votes), among the 4,676 ballots cast by the borough's 6,492 registered voters, for a turnout percentage of 72.0.

In the 2013 gubernatorial election, Republican Chris Christie received 71.4% of the vote (2,064 cast), ahead of Democrat Barbara Buono with 27.1% (782 votes), and other candidates with 1.5% (43 votes), among the 2,960 ballots cast by the borough's 6,897 registered voters (71 ballots were spoiled), for a turnout of 42.9%. In the 2009 gubernatorial election, Republican Chris Christie received 64.3% of the vote (2,169 ballots cast), ahead of Democrat Jon Corzine with 27.8% (937 votes), Independent Chris Daggett with 5.2% (175 votes) and other candidates with 1.7% (57 votes), among the 3,375 ballots cast by the borough's 6,933 registered voters, yielding a 48.7% turnout.

Education
Public school students in kindergarten through twelfth grade attend the Toms River Regional Schools, a regional public school system based primarily in Toms River Township that is the state's largest suburban district. In addition to students from Toms River, the district also serves the boroughs of Beachwood, Pine Beach and South Toms River. As of the 2018–19 school year, the district, comprised of 18 schools, had an enrollment of 15,472 students and 1,171.6 classroom teachers (on an FTE basis), for a student–teacher ratio of 13.2:1. Students in kindergarten through 5th grades attend either Beachwood Elementary School in Beachwood or Pine Beach Elementary in the neighboring community of Pine Beach. Intermediate school students attend Toms River Intermediate School South in Beachwood for grades 6–8. High school students attend Toms River High School South in Toms River Township for grades 9–12. The district's board of education has nine members; seats are allocated based on population, with one seat allocated to Beachwood.

Transportation

Roads and highways

The Garden State Parkway passes through the borough, connecting Berkeley Township in the south to South Toms River in the north.

Public transportation
NJ Transit offers local bus service to and from Atlantic City on the 559 route.

Notable people

People who were born in, residents of, or otherwise closely associated with Beachwood include:
 Melbourne Armstrong Carriker (1879–1965), ornithologist
 Ashley Alexandra Dupré (born 1985), former Emperors Club VIP Diamond Girl, who was a central figure in the prostitution scandal with Eliot Spitzer, then New York Governor
 Mark Geiger (born 1974), soccer referee who officiated at the 2014 FIFA World Cup and the 2018 FIFA World Cup
 Jeffrey Moran (born 1946), Ocean County Surrogate and former member of the New Jersey General Assembly from 1986 to 2003, who served on the Beachwood Borough Council from 1970 to 1972

References

External links

 Beachwood municipal website
 Beachwood Historical Alliance
 Toms River Regional Schools
 
 School Data for the Toms River Regional Schools, National Center for Education Statistics
 Beachwood Branch of Ocean County Library
 Beachwood Volunteer Fire Company Station 16

 
1917 establishments in New Jersey
Borough form of New Jersey government
Boroughs in Ocean County, New Jersey
Populated places established in 1917